Drumbar Halt railway station served Donegal in County Donegal, Ireland.

The station opened on 1 August 1906 on the Donegal Railway Company line from Donegal to Ballyshannon.

It closed on 1 January 1960.

Routes

References

Disused railway stations in County Donegal
Railway stations opened in 1906
Railway stations closed in 1960
1906 establishments in Ireland
Railway stations in the Republic of Ireland opened in the 20th century